Wellington is a residential neighborhood  in the East End of  Freetown,  Sierra Leone. Wellington is densely populated, with an ethnically  diverse population.

Wellington is home to is several industrial estate, and several minor industries found in the country.  These include the Sierra Leone Brewery Limited, Marika Palm Kernel Enterprises, etc.

In 2021, it was the location of the Freetown fuel tanker explosion.

References

Neighbourhoods in Freetown
Populated coastal places in Sierra Leone
 Populated places established by Sierra Leone Creoles
Western Area